John Forrest Secondary College (abbreviated as JFSC) is an Independent Public secondary school in the Perth suburb of Morley, Western Australia.

History
John Forrest Secondary College was established in 1961 as Embleton High School. In 1963, it was renamed John Forrest High School. On 17 October 1964, Western Australian governor Douglas Kendrew officially opened the school as John Forrest Senior High School. The school is named after the first Premier of Western Australia, John Forrest. The gymnasium was built in 1965. During its construction, the roof collapsed after the steel girders bent.

In the late 1960s, the school became increasingly overcrowded, despite the 1966 establishment of Hampton High School nearby. In 1970, Morley High School was established, but a site had not been selected. At first, Morley High School consisted of 250 students at nine demountable classrooms on John Forrest school grounds. Morley had its own staff, principal and P&C association, but it used John Forrest's canteen, library and sporting facilities. Morley would later move out in 1973 when its own campus had been constructed.

From 2008 to 2010, a trade training centre was constructed at the school at a cost of $2.6 million. The facility is shared with Mount Lawley Senior High School.

In 2011, it became an Independent Public School. Alongside this, the school's name was changed to John Forrest Secondary College. In 2015, John Forrest started accepting year 7 students for the first time, becoming a 7-12 school, alongside most other public high schools in the state.

In 2020, it was awarded "best school garden" in the City of Bayswater Garden Awards.

Redevelopment
During the 2017 state election campaign, the Labor Party committed $50 million to build and refurbish facilities at John Forrest Secondary College if elected. Following that, the Liberal Party promised $15 million to upgrade the school if re-elected. The Labor party ended up winning the election, and so planning started on the $50 million upgrade.

In July 2019, an architect was appointed. During 2020, the school's tennis courts were relocated to make way for the new buildings. The construction is split into three stages. The first stage involves the construction of a performing arts facility for dance, drama, media, music and visual arts, a materials technology building for building and construction, woodwork, metalwork, engineering, robotics and mechatronics, and a building for food and textiles classes, a cafeteria and an IT centre. The second stage involves the demolition of the previous materials technology building and construction of a new sports hall. The final stage involves turning the old library into a new administration area, the old sports hall into a library and various other refurbishments to old facilities. Construction on the first stage started early 2021, and the final stage  The project will expand the capacity of the school to 1,300 students.

Programs

John Forrest Secondary College offers Department of Education endorsed specialist programs in Cricket, Music, Netball and Tennis, and the college based Academic Excellence Program (AEP) and Computer Science Program.

Cricket
John Forrest's cricket program is endorsed by the Western Australian Cricket Association. The cricket program includes four hours per week of class time, regular competitions, interstate and international cricket tours. Students play on a turf wicket at school grounds and often travel to the WACA Ground. The program is supported by patron Bruce Reid, who was a former student.

Music
To gain entry to the music program, students must audition. Students in the program do music theory, weekly instrumental lessons, ensembles outside class time and various performances and concerts. The music program is open to year 6's from nearby schools, where they travel to John Forrest for an hour each week. Facilities for music are two music classrooms and four instrumental rooms. Students can choose to do Music ATAR in years 11 and 12. Ashley Smith, former student of John Forrest, and now Head of Woodwind and Contemporary Performance at UWA Conservatorium of Music is the patron for the music program.

Netball
Netball students have four hours per week of class time and are involved in competitions. Jessica Anstiss, player for the West Coast Fever is the patron for the netball program.

Tennis
In the tennis program, students study tennis for four hours per week and participate in competitions. Margaret Court was the patron of the tennis program until October 2017 after the school board wrote to her, asking

Thanking the school "for the privilege of being patron for four years", Court formally withdrew from the position due to being "unable to support all the organisations she once did" because of increasing commitments. 

John Forrest was named Western Australia's most outstanding school at the 2017 WA Tennis Industry Awards Night.

Local intake area
John Forrest Secondary College's local intake area covers Ashfield, Bedford, most of Bayswater (excluding north of Collier Road), part of Dianella (south of Alexander Drive, Morley Drive and Light Street), part of Embleton (south of Collier Road), part of Inglewood (north-east of Dundas Road), part of Maylands, part of Morley (south-west of Walter Road and Collier Road) and a small part of Bassendean (near Ashfield).

Students living in the local intake area have a guaranteed place at the school if they apply. Students living outside the local intake area may join the school if they are accepted into one of the specialist programs or after being judged on a case-by-case basis.

Transport
John Forrest Secondary College is located near the Morley bus station and several bus routes. High frequency bus routes that stop nearby include the CircleRoute (routes 998 and 999), 950 and 955.

Academic results

Student numbers
Student numbers peaked at 1,500 in the late 1970s. Student numbers have significantly increased since 2015, partially due to year 7 students being accepted and the 2014 half cohort leaving.

List of principals

Notable alumni
 Phil Adams – Former cricketer.
 Chris Allen – Former WAFL footballer who played for East Perth as captain and Swan Districts Football Club
 Shane Clements – Retired cricketer
 Craig Edwards – Former WAFL footballer who played for East Perth and South Fremantle and won the 1989 Sandover Medal.
 Bruce Reid – Retired cricketer, patron for the John Forrest Secondary College cricket program.
 Alan Ridge – Former Liberal member for Kimberley and minister in the government of Charles Court
 Amber-Jade Sanderson – Labor member for Morley and former member for the East Metropolitan Region of the Legislative Council
 Dr Ashley William Smith – Clarinet player, Chair of Woodwind and Contemporary performance at the UWA Conservatorium of Music and patron for the John Forrest Secondary College music program.
 Gustav McKeon — Cricketer, currently an opening batter for the French National Cricket Team. Was the youngest ever player to score two hundreds in his first three matches in T20I matches.

See also

 List of schools in the Perth metropolitan area

References

Public high schools in Perth, Western Australia
Educational institutions established in 1961
1961 establishments in Australia
Morley, Western Australia